Roger Toothaker (163416 June 1692) was a physician from Billerica, Massachusetts who was accused of witchcraft during the Salem witch trials in May 1692. He was sent to Boston Jail where he died the following month.

Background
Roger Toothaker was born in England in 1634. In 1635, as an infant, Toothaker traveled to the Massachusetts Bay Colony from London, sailing from 21 August to 11 September on the Hopewell, led by Captain Babb. In 1638, his father, Roger Toothaker, died, possibly in Plymouth on 5 February. Later that year his mother Margaret married Ralph Hill on 21 December and they lived in Billerica. He served as an assistant to Samuel Eldred, and later became a physician although he had no formal medical training. In or around 1662 or 1663, his stepfather died. In 1665 he married Mary Allin, a midwife, and had eight children who survived infancy: Nathaniel, Martha, Allin, Roger, Sarah, Mary, Andrew, and Margaret.

Toothaker, a farmer and folk-healer, claimed to specialize in detecting and punishing witches. For several years before the Salem witch trials began in 1692, Toothaker had reportedly bragged to locals that he had taught his daughter, Martha Emerson, wife of Joseph Emerson, his trade and that she had killed a witch.

Salem witch trials
On 18 May 1692, Elizabeth Hubbard, Ann Putnam Jr., and Mary Walcott accused Toothaker of witchcraft. Elizabeth was the servant of William Griggs, Toothaker's competitor. On 28 May, Mary Toothaker, Margaret Toothaker (aged 9), Martha Carrier, and Elizabeth Jackson were arrested. John Willard of Salem, Thomas Farrar Sr. (or Farrer) of Lynn, and Elizabeth Hart were arrested, along with Toothaker. Toothaker's daughter Martha was also arrested but later released for lack of evidence.

Toothaker was sent to Boston Jail where he remained until his death the following month at age 57. His body was examined and it was confirmed that he died of natural causes, although it is impossible to separate his death from his imprisonment, and likely illness and/or maltreatment and/or malnutrition.

References

External links
 Article on Salem witch trials , Essortment.com; accessed 24 December 2014.

1634 births
1692 deaths
Date of death unknown
Kingdom of England emigrants to Massachusetts Bay Colony
People convicted of witchcraft
People from Billerica, Massachusetts
People of the Salem witch trials
Prisoners who died in Massachusetts detention
Witch hunters